Brongersma is a surname. Notable people with the surname include:

Edward Brongersma (1911–1998), Dutch politician and jurist
Leo Brongersma (1907–1994), Dutch zoologist, herpetologist, author and lecturer
Titia Brongersma (1650–1700), Dutch poet and writer